Nart or NART may refer to:

National Adult Reading Test
North American Racing Team
Nart sagas, Caucasian myths

Places 
Nart, Masovian Voivodeship, east-central Poland
Nart, Podlaskie Voivodeship, north-east Poland

See also
NARTH